Russia–Sweden relations date back to the 10th century; when Vikings called Varangians participated in the founding new states that later evolved into Russia, Ukraine and Belarus.

History

Historically the two countries have been connected since ancient days, when Swedish Vikings traded on the big Russian rivers and settled in slavic settlements that later became large cities such as Novgorod and Kyiv. These settlements gave rise to mutual bonds that were also dynastical, as a Varangian king (Rurik) started a dynasty that came to rule uninterruptedly from the 9th to 16th century as depicted in the Nestors chronicle. Even the name Russia is said to emanate from Varangians as the old name for Vikings in the east were Rus.

Wars
During the middle age several wars were fought between the Swedes and Russians, and eleven wars have been fought between Russia and Sweden since the 12th century.

The central theme of the 1600–1725 era was the struggle between Sweden and Russia for control of the Baltic, as well as territories around it. Russia was ultimately the winner, and Sweden lost its status as a major power. In 1610 the Swedish army marched into Moscow under the command of Jakob De la Gardie.  From 1623 to 1709, Swedish policy, particularly under Gustavus Adolphus (1611–32) and Charles XII (1697–1718), encouraged and militarily supported Ukrainian opposition to Muscovite Russian hegemony.  Gustavus Adolphus fought the Ingrian War against Russia. It ended in 1617 with the Treaty of Stolbovo, which excluded Russia from the Baltic Sea.  Sweden's most dramatic defeat on the battleground came in 1709 at the battle of Poltava, in an attempt to second the Ukrainian rebellion leader Mazepa. In these wars superior Russian forces often outnumbered Swedes, which however often stood their ground in battles such as those of Narva (1700) and Svensksund (1790) due to Sweden's capable military organisation.

Great Northern War

In 1700, a triple alliance of Denmark–Norway, Saxony–Poland–Lithuania and Russia launched a threefold attack on the Swedish protectorate of Swedish Holstein-Gottorp and provinces of Livonia and Ingria, aiming to draw advantage as Sweden was unaligned and ruled by a young and inexperienced king, thus initiating the Great Northern War. Leading the Swedish army against the alliance, King Charles XII won multiple victories despite being usually significantly outnumbered. A major victory over a Russian army some three times the size in 1700 at the Battle of Narva compelled Peter the Great to sue for peace which Charles then rejected. In 1706 Swedish forces under general Carl Gustav Rehnskiöld defeated over a combined army of Saxony and Russia at the Battle of Fraustadt. Russia was now the sole remaining hostile power.

Charles' subsequent march on Moscow met with initial success as victory followed victory, the most significant of which was the Battle of Holowczyn where the smaller Swedish army routed a Russian army twice the size. The campaign ended with disaster when the Swedish army suffered heavy losses to a Russian force more than twice its size at Poltava, Charles had been incapacitated by a wound prior to the battle rendering him unable to take command. The defeat was followed by Surrender at Perevolochna. Charles spent the following years in exile in the Ottoman Empire before returning to lead an assault on Norway, trying to evict the Danish king from the war once more in order to aim all his forces at the Russians. Two campaigns met with frustration and ultimate failure, concluding with his death at the Siege of Fredriksten in 1718.

At the time, most of the Swedish Empire was under foreign military occupation, though Sweden itself was still free.  This situation was later formalized, albeit moderated in the subsequent Treaty of Nystad. The close saw not only the end of the Swedish Empire but also of its powerful monarchy and war machine.

In the Great Northern War, Swedish prisoners of war were sent in considerable numbers to Siberia, where they numbered perhaps 25% of the population of Tobolsk, the capital of Siberia, and some settled permanently. St Petersburg, which is located at the same place as the originally Swedish city Nyen in the province Ingermanland, was also built to a great extent by Swedish prisoners of war. Estonia was under Swedish rule from 1558 to 1710; the territory was later ceded to Russia in 1721. All Estonian-Swedes from the island of Hiiumaa were forced to move to New Russia (present day Ukraine) by Catherine II of Russia, where they formed their very own village Gammalsvenskby.

Napoleonic wars
In the middle of the Napoleonic wars, 1803–1815, Tsar Alexander of Russia started a war against Sweden. The area included modern Sweden and Finland. Sweden relied on what it called 'The Gibraltar of the North'--the new fortifications at Sveaborg near modern-day Helsinki. It was prepared for heavy attacks and long sieges. Nevertheless, it surrendered to the Russians in a matter of weeks and 1808, due to the forceful demands of Russian General Jan Pieter van Suchtelen and the pusillanimous responses of Swedish Vice-Admiral Carl Olof Cronstedt.  After the war ended in 1809, Finland was handed over to Russia. Napoleon's invasion of Swedish Pomerania in January 1812 led to a rapprochement between Sweden and Russia that included Russian recognition of Swedish rule over Norway.  There never was another war between the two and Sweden lost its role as a major regional power.

20th Century
The Swedish diplomat Raoul Wallenberg between July and December 1944 issued protective passports and housed Jews, saving tens of thousands of Jewish lives in Hungary. In 1944 he was arrested in Hungary and imprisoned in Moscow where he is supposed to have died. This occurred in the days of the Soviet Union, but the issue has later even been discussed between Russia and Sweden.

On 27 October 1981, the Soviet submarine S-363, of a design NATO designated Whiskey class, ran aground in Swedish territorial waters near Karlskrona.  The stranded submarine was spotted in the early morning the following day by local fishermen, on the rocks in the Blekinge archipelago, resulting in an episode commonly labelled "Whiskey on the rocks".  During the incident, Swedish naval forces took up positions on the edges of Swedish waters. It was later revealed that the Swedish Premier Torbjörn Fälldin had issued the Swedish navy orders to open fire, should approaching units of the Soviet Navy enter Swedish territorial waters. Swedish defence research also confirmed there could be nuclear weapons aboard the submarine. Over the years, there have been many submarine incidents where the Soviet Union has tried to collect military information from Sweden, including sightings of Soviet submarines along the Swedish coastline and espionage affairs.

21st Century
Relations between the two nations worsened after Moscow in 2009 rejected plans for a major EU-Russia summit in Stockholm. Then-Russian president Dmitry Medvedev believed that the summit should take place in Brussels because he believed it was a more neutral place for the summit. Another source of tension in the Russo-Swedish relations is Russia's recognition of the two breakaway regions, Abkhazia and South Ossetia, which broke away from Georgia after the 2008 war in South Ossetia. Sweden's then-foreign minister Carl Bildt condemned Russia's actions, and compared it to that of Adolf Hitler's pre-Second World War aggression. Swedish politician Jan Björklund has also suggested that military units should be put on Gotland in case of a war between Russia and Sweden.

The Nord Stream 1 gas pipeline in the Baltic Sea from Russia to Germany was the topic of Swedish Defence Research Agency's Robert L. Larsson's 110-page study "Nord Stream, Sweden and Baltic Sea Security" (2007) that found a number of concerning aspects in the Nord Stream project. The Swedish Defence Commission, however, did not mention any military implications of the pipeline in its December 2007 report on security issues and instead called for strict environmental requirements and cooperation between Baltic Sea states on surveillance. The Swedish government gave its approval of the project in November 2009.

Russian bombers have operated close to Swedish airspace on a number of occasions after the Ukrainian crisis and this has caused a discussion in Sweden to scale up its defences which also happened in 2015 with acquisitions of more Gripen aircraft, submarines, anti aircraft missiles and deployment of troops to Gotland in the Baltic Sea.

In March 2018, relations deteriorated further due to the poisoning of Sergei and Yulia Skripal in Salisbury, United Kingdom. Upon the United Kingdom stating that Russia produced the agent used, Russia claimed that several countries including Sweden were producing Novichok, the nerve agent used in the Salisbury attack. The Swedish Minister for Foreign Affairs, Margot Wallström, called the accusations 'unacceptable' on Twitter. In response to the attack, Sweden expelled a Russian diplomat from Stockholm. In response, Russia expelled a Swedish diplomat from Moscow.

In May 2018 amid tensions with Russia, Sweden sent pamphlets to its households telling its citizens how to prepare in case of war, the first time Sweden had done so since the Cold War in the 1980s. In October 2020, Sweden declared that military spending would increase by 40 percent in 5 years citing Russian activity in the Baltic Sea.

In December 2021, Russia warned of "serious military and political consequences" in case of Sweden's NATO membership. In February 2022, after Russia invaded Ukraine, they made the same threats towards Sweden and Finland.

After the 2022 Russian invasion of Ukraine started, Sweden, as one of the EU countries, imposed sanctions on Russia, and Russia added all EU countries to the list of "unfriendly nations".

Football relations
With regard to football, Swedish footballers have earned, in recent years, successful careers in Russian Premier League, the top tier football league in Russia, and Swedish players, as well as players born in Sweden who have chosen to represent other countries, are increasingly omnipresent in Russian league. The most notable Swedish players to have played in Russia include Andreas Granqvist, Pontus Wernbloom, Kim Källström and Marcus Berg.

See also

 Russo-Swedish Wars
 Russians in Sweden
 Russian National Association
 Anti-Russian sentiment in Sweden
 Swedish School in Moscow
 Sweden–Ukraine relations
 Russia–NATO relations

References

Further reading
  Birgegård, Ulla; Sandomirskaia, Irina. In Search of an Order: Mutual Representations in Sweden & Russia during the Early Age of Reason (2004), 200pp.
 Englund, Peter. Battle That Shook Europe: Poltava & the Birth of the Russian Empire (2003), 287pp. 
 Lobanov-Rostovsky, Andrei. Russia and Europe, 1789–1825 (Greenwood Press, 1968) online
 Metcalf, Michael F. Russia, England and Swedish party politics 1762–1766: the interplay between great power diplomacy and domestic politics during Sweden's age of liberty (Rowman and Littlefield, 1977).
 Nordling, Carl.  "Capturing 'The Gibraltar of the North:'How Swedish Sveaborg was taken by the Russians in 1808." Journal of Slavic Military Studies 17.4 (2004): 715–725.
 Porshnev, B. F. Muscovy & Sweden in the Thirty Years' War, 1630–1635 (1996), 256pp. excerpt
 Wilson, Derek. "Poltava: The battle that changed the world." History Today 59.3 (2009): 23+.

External links

 Embassy of Russia in Stockholm
 Embassy of Sweden in Moscow
 Consulate General of Sweden in Saint Petersburg

 
Sweden
Bilateral relations of Sweden